Mursal Nabizada (-2023) was an Afghan politician, lawmaker and critic of the Taliban who served as a Member of the House of the People from Kabul.

Career 

Nabizada was elected to the House of the People, the lower chamber of the National Assembly, to represent Kabul in the 2018 Afghan parliamentary election. The inaugural session of the term was held on 29 June 2019. She sat on the parliamentary defence commission. She served in the National Assembly until the Taliban takeover of Afghanistan in August 2021 and was one of the few female members of parliament who stayed in Kabul after the takeover.

Outside parliament, she worked for the Institute for Human Resources Development and Research.

Personal life 

Nabizada was born in Nangarhar Province, Afghanistan, in 1993.

Death 

At around 3 am on 15 January 2023, Nabizada was shot to death on the first floor of her home in Kabul, along with one of her personal bodyguards, by unknown assailants. She was 32. Her brother and a security guard were injured. Another security guard fled with money and jewelry. Her murder was the first of a Member of Parliament since the 2021 Taliban takeover.

References 

1993 births
2023 deaths
Members of the House of the People (Afghanistan)
21st-century Afghan politicians
21st-century Afghan women politicians
2023 murders in Afghanistan
Assassinated Afghan politicians
Assassinations in Afghanistan
Deaths by firearm in Afghanistan
People from Kabul
Murder in Kabul
People murdered in Afghanistan